Oceanus: Act One is a 2015 American adventure, science-fiction short film which is a prequel to the upcoming film Oceanus: Odyssey One created by Jeffrey Morris.

Synopsis
On 13 September 2029, there is a large underwater base called Oceanus which houses 300 Scientists and Engineers. Sam, an engineer, and Erin, a marine biologist and Sam’s wife, go on a mission to release a pod on the surface of the water, which emits whale songs. However during the mission there is an issue with their backup power system in the pod, which Sam goes to look at, while Erin stays in the ship (submarine). A tsunami hits, sweeping Erin away from the pod. She loses radio contact with Sam. She takes the ship to the surface and sees the sky is on fire. She contacts Mitch Conrad, a commander at the Oceanus base, he reports the base has suffered damage from earthquakes. He surmises that there has been a big natural disaster, and advises Erin to return to the base. However she decides to go and look for Sam, plotting the direction of the tsunami to work out where he might be. She goes looking for him, and passes a large passenger plane which has sunk into the ocean. She realizes she can use the whale songs emitted from the pod to find it. She finds the pod, and speaks to Sam on the radio, he is coughing and sounds injured. She docks onto the pod, and opens the door. She gets Sam into the submarine. The submarines oxygen level is low, so they have to get back to the base quickly. They activate the auto pilot and use the spare oxygen tanks for air. They think they have seen the end of the world…

Cast
Sharif Atkins as Sam Jordan, a ship pilot and engineer.
Bruce Davison as Commander Mitch Conrad, a Commander of the Oceanus base.
Megan Dodds as Dr. Erin Kendall, a Marine Biologist.
Malcolm McDowell as Triton, the ship's computer.

Reception
The Continuing Voyage gave the film a positive review and Spoilerfreemovies gave the film a score of 8/10. Best Movies Guide also gave the film a positive review.

References

External links

2015 short films
American science fiction short films
2010s science fiction adventure films
Films set in 2029
Films with underwater settings
Films scored by Jeff Rona
American science fiction adventure films
2010s English-language films
2010s American films